Couronne was a  74-gun ship of the line of the French Navy.

Career
She participated in the Crimean War. On 22 July 1854, she ran aground off Åland, Grand Duchy of Finland but was undamaged. She took part in the Invasion of Algiers in 1830. She was later renamed Barricade, and Duperré after Admiral Duperré's death. She was used as a hulk from 17 August 1869, and broken up the next year.

See also
 List of ships of the line of France

References

Ships of the line of the French Navy
Téméraire-class ships of the line
Ships built in France
1824 ships
Maritime incidents in July 1854